The Frankfurt Main Cemetery (German: Hauptfriedhof) is the largest cemetery in Frankfurt am Main, Germany. It was opened in 1828. The cemetery is noted for its many monumental graves, its garden architecture and as the site of the graves of many notable individuals.

History

The Frankfurt Main Cemetery was planned as the replacement of St. Peter's Cemetery, which had been the main cemetery of the city since the 16th century. At the time, today's Main Cemetery was located outside of the city. The plans were met with resistance in the population. In particular, the still influential patrician families did not want to abandon their monumental family tombs at St. Peter's Cemetery. They only relented when larger monumental graves were also permitted on the new cemetery, contrary to the initial plan.

Notable graves
The references are to the graves' locations (Gewann unless otherwise noted).

A
 Wolfgang Abendroth (1906–1985), jurist
 Wilhelm Heinrich Ackermann (1789–1848), educator
 Franz Adickes (1846–1915), Mayor of Frankfurt 1890–1912
 Justinian von Adlerflycht (1761–1831), jurist and politician
 Theodor W. Adorno (1903–1969), philosopher
 Wilhelm Altheim (1871–1914), painter
 Alois Alzheimer (1864–1915), physician
 Alois Ammerschläger (1913–1995), businessman
 Rudi Arndt (1927–2004), Mayor of Frankfurt 1972–1977
 Hans von Auerswald (1792–1848), General and politician, E243

B
 Bertha Bagge (1859–1939), painter, J 61
 Karl Ballenberger (1801–1860) painter, F 47
 Anne Bärenz (1950–2005), jazz musician V 774
 August de Bary (1874–1954), physician, D
 Albrecht Becker (1840–1911), architect, J 120
 Jakob Becker (1810–1872), painter, F 143
 Peter Becker (1828–1904), painter, F 1889
 Wilhelm Amandus Beer (1837–1907), painter C 260
 Johann Adam Beil (1790–1852), senator and founder of the cemetery, C7
 Maria Belli-Gontard (1788–1883), author, Gruft 43
 Matthias Beltz (1945–2002), musician, XIII GG48
 Willy Berking (1910–1979), composer, Gedenkstätte E an der Mauer 339a
 Family von Bethmann, bankers B an der Mauer 362 + 400
 Ernst Beutler (1885–1960), literature, scholar, C214a
 Conrad Binding (1846–1933), founder of the Binding-Brauerei, F 816–817
 Friedrich Landolin Karl Freiherr von Blittersdorf (1792–1861), Baden politician and diplomat, an der Mauer 106
 Jakob Hermann Bockenheimer (1837–1908), surgeon, E an der Mauer 539a
 Fritz Boehle (1873–1916), painter and sculptor, X II 1
 Johann Friedrich Böhmer (1795–1863), historian, A 239
 Family Bolongaro, businessmen, an der Mauer 432
 Friedrich Bothe (1869–1952), historian, IV 171
 Rudolf Christian Böttger (1806–1881), chemist, J 751a
 Otto Brenner (1907–1972), businessman, E 1479b
 Antonie Brentano (1780–1869) and spouse Franz Brentano (1765–1844), merchant, Gruft 48
 Willi Brundert (1912–1970), Mayor of Frankfurt 1964–1970, II 204a
 Adolf von Brüning (1837–1884), founder of Hoechst AG, J an der Mauer 606–609
 Margarete Buber-Neumann (1901–1989), publisher, F 1908
 Carl Peter Burnitz (1824–1886), painter, E 724
 Rudolf Burnitz (1789–1849), architect, An der Mauer 516
 Rudolf Heinrich Burnitz (1827–1880), architect, An der Mauer 516

C–D
 Liesel Christ (1919–1996), actress, J 296
 Emil Claar (1847–1930), theatre director, I 183
 Hermine Claar-Delia (1848–1908), actress, I 183
 Philipp Otto Cornil (1824–1907), painter and art historian, D 12
 Sophie Cossaeus (1893–1965), actress, F 1459
 Philipp Jakob Cretzschmar (1786–1845), physician and founder of the Senckenberg Gesellschaft für Naturforschung, D 244/45
 Hermann Dechent (1850–1935), priest, A 282
 Franz Karl Delavilla (1884–1967), graphic artist, I 1354
 Jakob Fürchtegott Dielmann (1809–1885), painter, J 548
 Fritz Dietz (1909–1984), merchant, an der Mauer 410a

E–F
 Ludwig Edinger (1855–1918), physician, II GG 21
 Anna Edinger (1863–1929), women's rights activist, II GG 21
 Tilly Edinger (1897–1967), paleontologist, II GG 21
 August Euler (1868–1957), minister of aviation, IV 120
 Louis Eysen (1843–1899), painter, an der Mauer 555a
 Christian Wilhelm von Faber du Faur (1780–1857), jurist, General and military painter, D 86
 Karl Konstanz Viktor Fellner (1817–1866), Mayor of Frankfurt, D an der Mauer 164
 Anselm von Feuerbach (1775–1833), jurist, C an der Mauer 105
 Johann Karl von Fichard (1773–1829), historian, C a.d.Mauer 79
 Karl Flesch (1853–1915), politician  E 47a
 Berthold Freudenthal (1873–1929), jurist V 74a
 Leo Frobenius (1873–1938), Africa researcher, C 424

G–H
 Mausoleum Gans, built 1909 for Friedrich Ludwig von Gans IV
 Leo Gans (1843–1935), businessman, III GG 9
 Else Gentner-Fischer (1883–1943), opera singer, II 34
 Robert Gernhardt (1937–2006), author, A 1103
 Hermann Goepfert(1926–1982), painter, XIII 361
 Georg Goltermann (1824–1898), composer, D an der Mauer 153
 Familie Gontard, B Gruft 44
 Karl Graebe (1841–1927), chemist, D 75
 Günther Groenhoff (1908–1932), XIV 219b
 Georg Friedrich von Guaita (1772–1851), Mayor of Frankfurt, C 8
 Karl Gutzkow (1811–1878), author, D 272a
 Philipp Friedrich Gwinner (1796–1868), Mayor of Frankfurt, B an der Mauer 399
 Adolf Haeuser (1857–1938), industrialist, II 192
 Ferdinand Happ (1868–1952), poet, A 159a
 Eduard Ludwig von Harnier (1800–1868), Mayor of Frankfurt, E an der Mauer 359a
 Georg Hartmann (1870–1954), businessman, II 34
 Hans Hartz (1943–2002), songwriter, XIV 9
 Samuel Friedrich Hassel (1798–1876), singer and actor, A 24
 Heinrich Hasselhorst (1825–1904), painter, F 1820
 Eva Heller (1948–2008), author
 Philipp Helfmann (1843–1909), businessman, E 774
 Johann Friedrich Christian Hess (1785–1845), architect, D 457
 Friedrich Hessemer (1800–1860), architect, F II
 Kurt Hessenberg (1908–1994), composer G 540
 Karl Heussenstamm (1835–1913), Mayor of Frankfurt, G 428
 Carl Heinrich Georg von Heyden (1793–1866), Mayor of Frankfurt, D 216 an der Mauer
 Wilhelm Hill (1838–1902), composer, E 131
 Joseph Hoch (1815–1874), lawyer and founder of the Hoch Conservatory, Gruft 39
 Heinrich Hoffmann (1809–1894), author (Struwwelpeter), G an der Mauer 541
 Wilhelm Hollbach (1893–1962), Mayor of Frankfurt, I 1118
 Adolph von Holzhausen (1866–1923), F an der Mauer 184
 Anton Ulrich von Holzhausen (1754–1832), Mayor of Frankfurt, F an der Mauer 137
 Heinrich Holzmann (1879–1962), businessman, II GG3
 Johann Philipp Holzmann (1805–1870), businessman, F 568
 Arthur Hübscher (1897–1985), author and chairman of the Schopenhauer Society, A 24a (next to Arthur Schopenhauer)
 Ricarda Huch (1864–1947), author, II 204
 Wilhelm Friedrich Hufnagel (1754–1830), theologian, C Reihe 12/37

I–L
 Johannes Janssen (1829–1891), historian, E 562
 Wilhelm Jordan (1819–1904), author, F 946
 Rudolf Jung (1859–1922), historian, G 1500
 Heinz-Herbert Karry (1920–1981), politician, XIV 202
 Anton Kirchner (1779–1835), historian, D 60
 Johanna Kirchner (1889–1944), political activist, I 242
 Heinrich Kleyer (1853–1932), businessman, II 191
 Ferdinand Karl Klimsch (1812–1890), painter, V 428
 Karl Ferdinand Klimsch (1841–1926), painter, V 428
 Walter Kolb (1902–1956), Mayor of Frankfurt A 55a
 Friedrich Krebs (1894–1961), Mayor of Frankfurt, XII 646
 Georg Ludwig Kriegk (1805–1878), historian, E 93
 Armin K.W. Kutzsche (1914–1995), physician, C
 Ludwig Landmann (1868–1945), Mayor of Frankfurt, A 290
 Jakob Latscha (1849–1912), businessman, J 463a
 Familie Julius Lejeune, B 106
 Theodor Lerner (1866–1931), journalist, A 47
 Felix Maria Vincenz Andreas Fürst von Lichnowsky (1814–1848), politician, E 243 (memorial)
 Bruno Liebrucks (1911–1986), philosopher, IV 207
 Alexander Linnemann (1839–1902), architect, F 1356
 Rose Livingston (1860–1914), philanthropist, F an der Mauer 460b
 Eugen Lucius (1834–1903), chemist, F 2046, 2047
 Carl Luley (1887–1966), actor, XIII 618

M–N
 Erwin Madelung (1881–1972), physicist, A 609
 Charlotte Mahler (1894–1973), surgeon, II GG 31
 Ernst Majer-Leonhard (1889–1966), school leader, E
 Carl Malß (1792–1848), poet, A Reihe 94/98
 Albert Mangelsdorff (1928–2005), jazz musician, XV 31
 Friedrich Nicolas Manskopf (1869–1928), wine merchant, D 294
 Edwin von Manteuffel (1809–1885), General, Altes Portal (memorial)
 Ernst May (1886–1970), architect, A 274
 Carl Friedrich Wilhelm Meister (1827–1895), industrialist, an der Mauer 450
 Cécile Charlotte Sophie Mendelssohn Bartholdy née Jeanrenaud (1817–1851), wife of Felix Mendelssohn Bartholdy, E 172
  (1881–1960), industrialist and philanthropist, II GG 10, 11
 Wilhelm Merton (1848–1916), Industrialist, II GG 10,11
 Albert von Metzler (1839–1918), banker, C 88
 Johann Friedrich von Meyer (1772–1849), senator, an der Mauer D 176
 Johannes von Miquel (1828–1901), Mayor of Frankfurt, D 297
 Alexander Mitscherlich (1908–1982), author, J 1049
 Margarete Mitscherlich (1917–2012), physician, J 1049
 Franz Joseph Molitor (1779–1860), author, F 250
 Walter Möller (1920–1971), Mayor of Frankfurt, II 202c
 Tycho Mommsen (1819–1900), philologist, F 1608
 Carl Morgenstern (1811–1893), painter F 864
 Johann Friedrich Morgenstern (1777–1844), painter, A 101
 Johann Georg Mouson (1812–1894), businessman, V 163
 Victor Müller (1830–1871), painter, an der Mauer 542a
 Daniel Heinrich Mumm von Schwarzenstein (1818–1890), Mayor of Frankfurt, A 84
 Ernst Franz August Münzenberger (1833–1890), art collector, B 141
  (1827–1916), photographer, C Gruft 24
 Karl Jonas Mylius (1839–1883), architect, C Gruft 24
 Josef Neckermann (1912–1992), B an der Mauer 380–81
 Christian Ernst Neeff (1782–1849), physician, an der Mauer 62
 Ludwig von Neher (1850–1916), architect, II GG 69
 Peter von Oubril (1774–1848), Russian diplomat, Gruft 13

P–R
 Alfons Paquet (1881–1944), journalist, A 276a
 Marie Paquet-Steinhausen (1881–1958), painter A 276a
 Johann David Passavant (1787–1861), art historian F 589
 Theodor Petersen (1836–1918), chemist, A 61
 Camille Armand Jules Marie, Prince de Polignac (1832–1913), American General, C Gruft 30
 Max Quarck (1860–1930), politician, E 743
 Meta Quarck-Hammerschlag (1864–1954), politician, E 743
 Joseph Joachim Raff (1822–1882), Swiss composer, D 298
 Ludwig Rehn (1849–1930), surgeon, V 143
 Marcel Reich-Ranicki (1920–2013), literature critic, XIV 34 UG
 Teofila Reich-Ranicki (1920–2011), artist, XIV 34 UG
 Countess Emilie von Reichenbach-Lessonitz née Ortlepp (1791–1843), wife of the Elector of Hesse, Mausoleum, F 1
 Carl Theodor Reiffenstein (1820–1893), painter, G 372
 Ferdinand Ries (1784–1837), composer and student of Beethoven
 Sebastian Rinz (1782–1861), C 155
 Friedrich Roessler (1813–1883), an der Mauer 444
 Ludwig Rottenberg (1864–1932), composer, II GG29
 Friedrich Rumpf (1795–1867), architect, an der Mauer 269a
 Eduard Rüppell (1794–1884), African researcher, F 155a

S
 Gottfried Scharff (1782–1855), merchant and Mayor of Frankfurt, B an der Mauer 330
 Friedrich Schierholz (1840–1894), sculptor, J 634 Plan Nr.158
 Adolf Schindling (1887–1963), senator, III
 Dorothea Schlegel née Mendelssohn (1763–1839), author, B 180
 Matthias Jacob Schleiden (1804–1881), botanist, J 751b
 Peter Schmick (1833–1899), architect, an der Mauer 465a
 Johann Friedrich Moritz Schmidt-Metzler (1838–1907), physician, C 90
 Pauline Schmidt (1840–1856), C 148
 Eduard Schmidt von der Launitz (1797–1869), sculptor, an der Mauer 398a
 Victor Schmieden (1874–1945), surgeon XIV 33
 Otto Scholderer (1834–1902), painter F 185a
 Arthur Moritz Schoenflies (1853–1928), XIV 403
 Arthur Schopenhauer (1788–1860), philosopher, A 24
 Norbert Schrödl (1842–1912), painter, I 531
 Samuel Thomas von Soemmerring (1755–1830), anatomist, an der Mauer 178
 Elisabeth Schwarzhaupt (1901–1986), politician, II 268
 Johann Baptist von Schweitzer (1833–1875), politician, Gruft 32
 Hermann Senf (1878–1979), architect, VII 231a
 Lutz Sikorski (1950–2011), politician, D 550
 Albert Steigenberger (1889–1958), IV 125
 Wilhelm Steinhausen (1846–1924), painter, E 577a
 David Stempel (1869–1927), II 220
 Adolf Stoltze (1842–1933), poet, II GG 23
 Friedrich Stoltze (1816–1891), journalist, J 306, 
 Ignatz Stroof (1838–1920), chemist, I 212
 Carl-Heinrich von Stülpnagel (1886–1944), General, an der Mauer 402b (memorial)

T–Z
 Alfred Teves and family, businessman, II 135
 Gustav Treupel (1867–1926), physician, V
 Abisag Tüllmann (1935–1996), photographer, F 1763
 Siegfried Unseld (1924–2002), publisher, II 203
 Franz Volhard (1872–1950), physician, V 311
 Friedrich Karl Waechter (1937–2005), cartoonist, J 1066
 Walter Wallmann (1932–2013), Mayor of Frankfurt, XIV, 32
 Beda Weber (1798–1858), German Benedictine professor, author, and member of the Frankfurt Parliament, B 141, 142
 Arthur von Weinberg (1860–1943), businessman, II GG 29, 29a, 30
 Marianne von Willemer (1784–1860), Goethe's love interest, D 261
 Franz Xaver Winterhalter (1805–1873), painter, C 123/124
 Johann Georg August Wirth (1798–1848), author, A 98–88
 Paul Wolff (1887–1951), physician, II GG 17a
 Julius Ziehen (1864–1925), educator D 228
 Johann Nepomuk Zwerger (1796–1868), sculptor D 256

References

Literature
 Victor von Brauchitsch, Helga von Brauchitsch: Zum Gedenken – Grabmale in Frankfurt am Main. Kramer, Frankfurt am Main 1988, .
 Peter Braunholz, Britta Boerdner, Christian Setzepfandt: Der Frankfurter Hauptfriedhof. Societäts-Verlag, Frankfurt am Main 2009, .
 Ebba D. Drolshagen: Der melancholische Garten: Ein Spaziergang über den Frankfurter Hauptfriedhof. Heinrich und Hahn, Frankfurt am Main 2006, .
 Ebba D. Drolshagen: Der melancholische Garten: Der Frankfurter Hauptfriedhof und seine Grabdenkmäler im 19. Jahrhundert. Fricke, Frankfurt am Main 1987, .
 Bettina Erche: Der Frankfurter Hauptfriedhof. Supplement-Band zur Denkmaltopographie Stadt Frankfurt am Main. Henrich, Frankfurt am Main 1999, .
 Friedhofsverwaltung der Stadt Frankfurt am Main – Grünflächenamt – Abteilung Friedhofsangelegenheiten: Der Friedhofswegweiser – Informationen, Hinweise, Standorte, Historie, Anschriften, Inserate. Mammut-Verlag, Leipzig, 2012.

External links 
 
 
 

Buildings and structures in Frankfurt
Religion in Frankfurt
Tourist attractions in Frankfurt